The Journal of Social Work is a peer-reviewed academic journal that covers research in the field of social work. The editor-in-chief is Steven M. Sharlow. It was established in 2001 and is currently published by SAGE Publications.

Abstracting and indexing 
The Journal of Social Work is abstracted and indexed in Scopus and the Social Sciences Citation Index. According to the Journal Citation Reports, its 2010 impact factor is 0.605, ranking it 21 out of 36 journals in the category "Social Work".

References

External links 
 

SAGE Publishing academic journals
English-language journals
Quarterly journals
Publications established in 1997
Sociology journals